John Peter may refer to:

 John Peter (critic) (1938–2020), theatre critic for the Sunday Times
 John Peter (novelist) (1921–1983), Canadian English literature scholar, essayist, and novelist
 John Peter (field hockey) (1937–1998), Indian field hockey player
 John Peter (music director), Indian film score and soundtrack composer
 John Peter, former name of Kenyan leader Jomo Kenyatta

See also

John Petre (disambiguation)